James Berardinelli (born September 25, 1967) is an American film critic and former engineer. His reviews are mainly published on his blog ReelViews. Approved as a critic by the aggregator Rotten Tomatoes, he has published two collections of reviews of movies on DVD and video. He is also a fantasy novelist, publishing a trilogy from 2015 through 2016 known as The Last Whisper of the Gods.

Personal life
Berardinelli was born in New Brunswick, New Jersey and spent his early childhood in Morristown, New Jersey. When he was nine, his family moved to the township of Cherry Hill, New Jersey, where he attended Cherry Hill High School East. Later he moved to Piscataway.

He attended the University of Pennsylvania from 1985 to 1990, obtaining both a bachelor's and master's degree in electrical engineering. After graduating he worked for Bellcore Company, now Telcordia Technologies. He worked during the next 15 years "in a variety of fields, including fiber optics, video testing, and software systems."

Berardinelli has categorized himself as an agnostic and a libertarian. He resides in Mount Laurel, New Jersey with his wife, Sheryl, whom he met through his website. They have two children: a son born in May 2010, and a daughter born in November 2019.

Career
Starting in January 1992, Berardinelli began writing movie reviews, his first being a review of the 1991 drama Grand Canyon. His first review published to the Internet was of the 1992 drama Scent of a Woman, which was posted both to Usenet and his Colossus Inc-hosted website, ReelViews.

Roger Ebert referred to Berardinelli as "the best of the Web-based critics" in 2001, and wrote a foreword for the 2003 book, Reelviews, a collection of Berardinelli's reviews. Berardinelli is a member of the Broadcast Film Critics Association and is a Rotten Tomatoes-approved critic.

In January 2004, he began his blog ReelThoughts, by which time his reviews could attract as many as 100,000 readers, up from around 1,400 weekly readers in 1997. In August 2006, the site moved to ReelViews.net, a domain Berardinelli had originally registered by late 2000.

In September 2013, Berardinelli announced that he had been working on a trilogy of fantasy novels entitled The Last Whisper of the Gods. The first book was published in November 2015, the second was released in January 2016, and the third in March 2016.

Berardinelli appears as a guest on the pop-culture radio program Fictional Frontiers every two weeks.

Annual film rankings

Bibliography
 Berardinelli, James (2003) ReelViews : The Ultimate Guide to the Best 1,000 Modern Movies on DVD and Video, 
 Berardinelli, James (2005) ReelViews 2: The Ultimate Guide to the Best 1,000 Modern Movies on DVD and Video, 2005 Edition,  
 Berardinelli, James (2015) The Last Whisper of the Gods, ASIN B-016IWS-UN-M
 Berardinelli, James (2016) The Curse of the Gift, ASIN B-019CPR-EH-K
 Berardinelli, James (2016) The Shadow of the Otherverse, ASIN B-01BRSW-VH-S
 Berardinelli, James (2017) The Lingering Haze,

References

External links

 ReelViews.net (official site)

1967 births
20th-century American male writers
20th-century American non-fiction writers
21st-century American male writers
21st-century American non-fiction writers
21st-century American novelists
American agnostics
American electrical engineers
American film critics
American libertarians
American male bloggers
American bloggers
American male non-fiction writers
American writers of Italian descent
Cherry Hill High School East alumni
Engineers from New Jersey
Living people
Novelists from New Jersey
Online Film Critics Society
Patreon creators
People from Cherry Hill, New Jersey
People from Morristown, New Jersey
People from Mount Laurel, New Jersey
University of Pennsylvania School of Engineering and Applied Science alumni
Writers from New Brunswick, New Jersey